Thomas Borwick is an SEO strategist, CEO and right-wing digital influencer. He has undertaken work for Vote Leave and the Conservative Party.

The son of Victoria and Jamie Borwick (a Conservative politician and peer, respectively), Thomas Borwick studied at the University of Richmond, Virginia. After graduating, he worked at Killik & Co, before founding his own company, Kanto Systems, in 2012.

Borwick worked for Cambridge Analytica and AggregateIQ, and was chief technology officer for Vote Leave before creating the campaigning group 3rd Party Ltd in order to influence the outcome of the 2019 United Kingdom general election. As part of this campaign, Borwick ran targeted Facebook advertisements calling for voters to vote for the Green Party, possibly in a move to divide the anti-Conservative vote. However, given that these ads were run both in swing (Plymouth) and non-swing constituencies (Oxford), the campaign may have been a strategy for harvesting data on Green Party supporters. He has also operated numerous other companies, including Disruptive Communications Ltd, which he started in partnership with Douglas Carswell, formerly of the UK Independence Party; and Voter Consultancy Ltd, whose micro-targeting of Facebook adverts led to death threats against anti-Brexit MPs and a subsequent investigation by the Information Commissioner's Office.

In 2015 Borwick was assaulted by three women in a London branch of KFC, along with his girlfriend. Borwick was critical of the restaurant's bouncers, who he claimed did not assist him after he cried for help, but instead simply escorted him from the premises.

References

Social media companies
Right-wing politics
Living people
Younger sons of barons
Year of birth missing (living people)